Sisai is a village in the Sisai CD block in the Gumla subdivision of the Gumla district in the Indian state of Jharkhand.

Geography

Location                           
Sisai is located at

Area overview 
The map alongside presents a rugged area, consisting partly of flat-topped hills called pat and partly of an undulating plateau, in the south-western portion of Chota Nagpur Plateau. Three major rivers – the Sankh, South Koel and North Karo - along with their numerous tributaries, drain the area. The hilly area has large deposits of Bauxite. 93.7% of the population lives in rural areas.

Note: The map alongside presents some of the notable locations in the district. All places marked in the map are linked in the larger full screen map.

Civic administration   
There is a police station at Sisai. 
  
The headquarters of Sisai CD block are located at Sisai village.

Demographics 
According to the 2011 Census of India, Sisai had a total population of 10,075, of which 5,084 (50%) were males and 4,991 (50%) were females. Population in the age range 0–6 years was 1,531. The total number of literate persons in Sisai was 6,696 (78.37% of the population over 6 years).

(*For language details see Sisai block#Language and religion)

Education
B.N.J. College, also known as Baijnath Jalan College, established in 1976, is affiliated with Ranchi University.

Rajyakrit High School Sisai is a Hindi-medium coeducational institution established in 1971. It has facilities for teaching from class I to class X. It has a playground, a library with 1,761 books and has 7 computers for teaching and learning purposes.

Ashram Awasiya Balika High School Sisai is a Hindi-medium girls only institution established in 2006.It has facilities for teaching from Class VI to Class X. The school has a library with 500 books.

References 

Villages in Gumla district